John Lotz (August 13, 1933 – April 18, 2020) was an American wrestling referee and actor. Lotz worked predominantly for the World Wrestling Federation (now World Wrestling Entertainment). Lotz officiated at the first three WrestleMania events during the 1980s.

Biography
Born in Yonkers, New York he started his career as an elevator assembly worker and later a truck driver for 'Yonkers Butter and Eggs'. He enlisted in the US Navy and served in the Korean War between 1951 and 1954.

Lotz had a 33-year career as a referee for the New York State Athletic Commission. He was the referee for Bob Backlund's victory over Superstar Billy Graham in 1978 for the WWWF Heavyweight Championship as well as for Hulk Hogan's victory over The Iron Sheik in 1984 for the same championship, then renamed the WWF Heavyweight Championship.

Lotz refereed matches in the first three WrestleMania events, including the boxing match between Rowdy Roddy Piper and Mr. T at WrestleMania 2. 

Outside of wrestling, Lotz appeared in the films Raging Bull and The Hurricane as well as the television drama, The Sopranos. 

Lotz died on April 18, 2020, due to complications from COVID-19 at the age of 86 in Yonkers, New York, during the COVID-19 pandemic in New York (state).

Filmography

References 

1933 births
2020 deaths
Professional wrestling referees
People from Yonkers, New York
Deaths from the COVID-19 pandemic in New York (state)